Layla Al-Attar (May 7, 1944 – June 27, 1993) was an Iraqi artist and painter who became the Director of the Iraqi National Art Museum. Through her art, al-Attar expressed ideals that attempted to recognize the importance of women in all spheres of society.

Life and career
Al-Attar graduated from the Academy of Fine Arts in Baghdad in 1965, and was among the first female graduates from that program. She became the Director of the Center for National Art (now the Iraqi Museum of Modern Art), a post she held until her death in 1993.

Al-Attar held five one-woman shows in Iraq, and took part in all national and other collective exhibitions held in the country and abroad. Al-Attar also took part in the Kuwait Biennial (1973), the first Arab Biennial (Baghdad 1974), the second Arab Biennial (1976), the Kuwait Biennial (1981), and won the Golden Sail Medal in the Cairo Biennial (1984).

On 27 June 1993, Al-Attar, her husband, and their housekeeper were killed by a U.S. missile attack on the Iraqi Intelligence main building which was just behind her house, ordered by U.S. President Bill Clinton. The building was hit by 24 rockets. Two misfired and hit their house accidentally, per her son's testimony. The attack also blinded Al-Attar's daughter. There are some rumours the misfire was intended due to an unflattering mosaic of President George H. W. Bush, designed by Al-Attar, laid onto the floor at the entrance to the Al-Rashid Hotel in Baghdad. Additionally, some allege that Al-Attar used pieces of her destroyed home during the American bombings in 1991 to create this controversial mosaic. The idea was that nobody would be able to get into the hotel, where most foreign visitors to Iraq stayed in the 1990s, without stepping on Bush’s face. The mosaic was removed when Baghdad was captured on 9 April 2003. Her death was met with an angry response in Baghdad. 

Her sister, Suad al-Attar, is also an artist who now lives and works in London.

Legacy
The character Layal in the play Nine Parts of Desire is based on Al-Attar. Author Heather Raffo, stated that she saw a painting by Al-Attar in an art gallery and was curious about it. This inspired her to write the play. While the Al-Attar character is central in it, the character is written as fictional and does not depict any specific relation to the real Layla Al Attar 

Kris Kristofferson dedicated and wrote a song about Al-Attar, called "The Circle", which appears on his live album Broken Freedom Song: Live from San Francisco.  In the live introduction to the song on that CD, Kristofferson explains that it covers both the death of Layla Al-Attar and the problem of Los desaparecidos, the Argentines who "disappeared." They were secretly arrested and murdered by the Argentinian dictatorial government. He states that he linked the two as examples of governments taking no responsibility for the deaths of non-combatants.
 
Marta Gomez later covered the song on a tribute album,  The Pilgrim. A celebration of Kris Kristofferson, adding a verse in Spanish.

See also
 Iraqi art
 Islamic art
 List of Iraqi artists

References

External links
 Layla Al Attar at Iraqiart.com - digital archive of reproductions of artworks, many of which were stolen or damaged during the 2203 lootings and not accessible via any other reliable public source

1944 births
1993 deaths
Artists from Baghdad
Iraqi activists
Iraqi contemporary artists
Iraqi painters
Iraq War casualties
Iraqi women painters
20th-century women artists